Johann Daniel Bager, who was born at Wiesbaden in 1734, was a fruit and flower painter. He worked for some time at Frankfurt, where he died in 1815. Two works by him are in the Städel Gallery in that city. He was taught by his step-father Justus Juncker.

See also
 List of German painters
 Justus Juncker

References
 

18th-century German painters
18th-century German male artists
German male painters
19th-century German painters
19th-century German male artists
1734 births
1815 deaths
People from Wiesbaden